Jef Bruyninckx (13 January 1919 – 15 January 1995) was a Belgian film actor, editor and director.

Selected filmography
Actor
 De Witte (1934)
 Alleen voor U (1935)
 Janssens tegen Peeters (1939)
 Janssens en Peeters dikke vrienden (1940)

Bibliography
 Mathijs, Ernest. The Cinema of the Low Countries. Wallflower Press, 2004.

External links

1919 births
1995 deaths
Belgian film directors
Belgian male film actors
People from Duffel
20th-century Belgian male actors